Viju Abraham is an Indian judge who is presently serving as a judge of Kerala High Court. The court of justice Abraham was one among the three paperless courts started functioning from 01 August, 2022 in Kerala High Court.

Education and career
Abraham graduated in Law from Government Law College, Ernakulam and started to practice as a lawyer in 1996. He served as Government Pleader from 2004 to 2007 and as Senior Government Pleader from 2011 to 2016 in Kerala High Court. He was appointed as Additional Judge of High Court of Kerala on 11.08.2021 and assumed office on 13 August 2021.

Notable rulings
In August 2022, bench of Justice Abraham issued strict direction to the Kerala Police and Kerala Motor Vehicle Department to conduct routine checking in public road transport services while considering an application for bail of a driver of a public transport who was booked under Narcotic Drugs and Psychotropic Substances Act, 1985 and expressed its concern about the danger to the life of the general public.

References

External links
 High Court of Kerala

Living people
Judges of the Kerala High Court
21st-century Indian judges
1972 births
Indian judges